Qeshlaq-e Qaleh Now-e Amlak (also Romanized as Qeshlāq-e Qal‘eh Now-e Amlāk; also known as Qeshlāq-e Qal‘eh Now and Qeshlāq Qal‘eh) is a village in Ferunabad Rural District, in the Central District of Pakdasht County, Tehran Province, Iran. At the 2006 census, its population was 407, in 89 families.

References 

Populated places in Pakdasht County